Make Politicians History was a minor United Kingdom political party that advocated the abolition of Parliament in favour of devolution to city-states and decision-making by referendum. From the 1980s, the group stood under various descriptions, including Vote For Yourself, www.xat.org and Vote For Yourself Rainbow Dream Ticket. It officially disbanded in 2009.

This list may not be complete.

Enfield Southgate by-election, 14 July 1984

Greenwich by-election, 26 February 1987

Kensington by-election, 14 July 1988

General election, 1992

General election, 1997

Source:

Uxbridge by-election, 31 July 1997

General election, 2001

General election, 2005

Source:

There were three candidates in the 2003 Northern Ireland Assembly election.

Under the title Make Politicians History, Weiss stood in the four Belfast constituencies in the Northern Ireland Assembly elections in 2007.

Haltemprice & Howden by-election, 10 July 2008

References

Election results by party in the United Kingdom
Defunct political parties in the United Kingdom
Political parties established in 1984
Political parties disestablished in 2009